Idols South Africa I was the first season of South African reality interactive talent show based on the British talent show Pop Idol. It started as the second international spin-off of the original series just days after the first Idol season in Poland. However, as it ended earlier the winner Heinz Winckler is the second Idol winner after the original Pop Idol Will Young.
Simon Cowell, judge of the original series was guest judging during the theater round when the Top 50 was chosen. The remaining contestants where then split in 10 groups of 5 where the most vote getter would move on to the top 10. However, as a voting error occurred during the voting for the first group, Melanie Lowe (who was a close second behind Brandon October) was saved by the producers making it a top 11 instead.
In the beginning the show was hosted by Matthew Stewardson and Candy Litchfield. However halfway through the season Stewardson was axed and replaced by Sami Sabitiin. Soon after that Stewardson checked himself into a rehab center. The show saw a tragic incident when the programme's main photographer suddenly died during the competition. In the course of the season complaints about the results of votings and technical problems became loud and created a mistrust from the audience which eventually lasted over the upcoming seasons.

Finals

Finalists
(ages stated at time of contest)

Elimination Chart

Note: The results of every second semifinal group were announced together.

Live show details

Heat 1 (10 March 2002)

Heat 2 (17 March 2002)

Heat 3 (24 March 2002)

Heat 4 (31 March 2002)

Heat 5 (7 April 2002)

Heat 6 (14 April 2002)

Heat 7 (21 April 2002)

Heat 8 (28 April 2002)

Heat 9 (5 May 2002)

Heat 10 (12 May 2002)

Live Show 1 (19 May 2002)
Theme: Movie Magic

Live Show 2 (26 May 2002)
Theme: My Own Idol

Live Show 3 (2 June 2002)
Theme: Proudly South African

Live Show 4: Semi-final (9 June 2002)
Theme: Judges' Choice

Live final (16 June 2002)

References

External links
 Idols I website on IOL
 Profiles of the Top 50 contestants

Season 01
2002 South African television seasons